The 2011–12 América season was the 65th professional season of Mexico's top-flight football league. The season is split into two tournaments—the Torneo Apertura and the Torneo Clausura—each with identical formats and each contested by the same eighteen teams. América began their season on July 25, 2011 against Querétaro, América play their homes games on Sundays at 4:00pm local time.

Torneo Apertura

Squad

Out on loan

Regular season

Apertura 2011 results

América did not qualify to the Final Phase

Goalscorers

Results

Results summary

Results by round

Transfers

In

Out

Torneo Clausura

Squad

Regular season

Clausura 2012 results

Final phase

América advanced 3–2 on aggregate

 
Monterrey advanced 2–0 on aggregate

Goalscorers

Regular season

Source:

Final phase

Results

Results summary

Results by round

References

2011–12 Primera División de México season
Mexican football clubs 2011–12 season
2011-12